Anthony Lovett "Rocky" Belk (June 20, 1960 – July 15, 2010) was an American football wide receiver who played one season with the Cleveland Browns of the National Football League (NFL). He was drafted by the Browns in the seventh round of the 1983 NFL Draft. He played college football at the University of Miami and attended Fort Hunt High School in Alexandria, Virginia. Belk died after a lengthy illness on July 15, 2010.

References

External links
Just Sports Stats
College stats

1960 births
2010 deaths
Players of American football from Virginia
American football wide receivers
African-American players of American football
Miami Hurricanes football players
Cleveland Browns players
Sportspeople from Alexandria, Virginia
20th-century African-American sportspeople
21st-century African-American people